Yin Jian (born December 25, 1978, in Xichang, Liangshan, Sichuan) is a double Olympic medal winning Chinese sailor, in women's windsurfing.

Yin won the silver medal in the 2004 women's Olympic sailboard competition.  
She was the 2008 Olympic women's windsurfing champion, achieving dominance over the fleet in light wind conditions with four race victories.

2008 Summer Olympic regatta

References

External links
 
 
 
 

1978 births
Living people
Chinese windsurfers
Female windsurfers
Chinese female sailors (sport)
Olympic sailors of China
Olympic silver medalists for China
Olympic gold medalists for China
Olympic medalists in sailing
Sailors at the 2004 Summer Olympics – Mistral One Design
Sailors at the 2008 Summer Olympics – RS:X
Medalists at the 2008 Summer Olympics
Medalists at the 2004 Summer Olympics
Asian Games silver medalists for China
Asian Games medalists in sailing
Sailors at the 2002 Asian Games
Medalists at the 2002 Asian Games
People from Liangshan
Sportspeople from Sichuan
21st-century Chinese women